Globe Shipbuilding may refer to:
 Globe Shipbuilding and Dry Dock Company of Maryland, former name of Maryland Drydock Company
 Globe Shipbuilding Company, company operated in World War I in Superior, Wisconsin that built ships for the United States Shipping Board
 Globe Shipbuilding Company, company operated in World War II in Superior, Wisconsin that built ships for the United States Maritime Commission under Walter Butler Shipbuilders

References